The 1959 NBA All Star Game was the ninth NBA All-Star Game.

Roster

Western Conference
Head Coach: Ed Macauley, St. Louis Hawks

Eastern Conference
Head Coach: Red Auerbach, Boston Celtics

References

National Basketball Association All-Star Game
All-Star Game
NBA All-Star Game
Basketball competitions in Detroit
NBA All-Star Game
NBA All-Star Game